Dekha Ibrahim Abdi (1964 - 14 July 2011) was a Kenyan peace activist based in Mombasa, Kenya. She worked as a consultant to government and civil society organisations. She was of Somali ethnicity.

Personal life
Dekha was born in 1964 in Wajir. She was married to Dr. Hassan Nurrow Abdirahman with whom she had four children. The couple divorced in 2007 and in 2009, she married Abdinoor, a Kenyan Somali ophthalmologist.

Career
Dekha was a trustee of Coalition for Peace in Africa (COPA) and of NOMADIC, a pastoralist organisation based in Wajir. She was also a founding member of the Wajir Peace and Development Committee, the Coalition for Peace in Africa, ACTION (Action for Conflict Transformation), and the Peace and Regeneration Oasis (PRO).

Dekha worked as a consultant trainer on peacebuilding and pastoralists' development with many local and international agencies in various countries, including Cambodia, Jordan, Ethiopia, Somalia, South Africa, Netherlands, Israel, Palestine, Zimbabwe, the UK, Uganda and Kenya. She was also an Associate of Responding to Conflict and previously worked as RTC's Trainer and Learning Coordinator. Some of her mediation and peacebuilding insights can be read up in the book "Mediation and Governance in Fragile Contexts: Small Steps to Peace"  that was published in 2019. Audio clkjhps of interviews of 2010 and 2011 with Dekha can be found online.

Awards
In 2007, Dekha was honoured with the Right Livelihood Award. The Jury commended her "for showing in diverse ethnic and cultural situations how religious and other differences can be reconciled, even after violent conflict, and knitted together through a cooperative process that leads to peace and development".

She was also honoured with Gernika´s Peace and Reconciliation Prize in 2008 (Basque Country) and Hessian Peace Prize of Germany in 2009.

Death
On 7 July 2011, Dekha, her husband Abdinoor, and their driver were on their way to a peace conference in Garissa, when their car crashed into a truck. Her husband and driver died instantly. Dekha sustained heavy injuries and was airlifted to Nairobi. She died shortly afterwards at the Aga Khan Hospital at 11.45 am, 14 July 2011. She was 47 years old.

See also
Right Livelihood Award
List of peace activists

Notes

References
Abdi on the Website of the Right Livelihood Award

External links
Working for Peace in Conflict Systems in Kenya - Addressing the Post-Election Crisis 2008 
Biography of Dekha Ibrahim Abdi

1964 births
2011 deaths
Kenyan Muslims
Kenyan people of Somali descent
Road incident deaths in Kenya
Somalian Muslims
Kenyan women activists
People from Wajir County
Kenyan anti-war activists